Charles Massy (1695 - 1766) was Dean of Limerick from 1740 until his death.

He was educated at Trinity College, Dublin.  He was Chancellor of Emly from 1727 to 1739; and then Precentor. His nephew George Massy was Archdeacon of Ardfert from 1772 to 1782.

Massy’s daughter Grace married William Barton (1723–1792), of Grove House, Fethard, County Tipperary, and was the mother of several children, including Lt. General Charles Barton, General Sir Robert Barton, and Thomas Barton, a member of the Irish House of Commons.

References

Irish Anglicans
Deans of Limerick
1766 deaths
Year of birth unknown
Diocese of Limerick, Ardfert and Aghadoe
1695 births
Alumni of Trinity College Dublin